Kankai is a Hindu's holy place situated in the middle of Gir National Park in Junagadh district of Saurashtra region in the state of Gujarat, India.

Location
Located inside Gir forest, Gujarat, India.

History
The Indian mega-epic Mahabharata's famous character Arjuna comes alive here so this place is famous because of him. Once traveling through this forest, Pandavas gets thirsty and Arjuna uses his bow to discover water from the earth. There is a Mahadev temple here called 'Banej'.

Temple and Surroundings

The main temple is "Shri Kankeshwari Mataji" also known as "Shri Kankai Mataji". Mataji is principal goddess (કુળદૅવી) to many castes in India; Like Vaishya Suthar (Vadhia and Padhiyar), Gurjar Suthar(Panchasara), Bhawsar (bahekar), Uneval Brahmins, Bhadreshwara-Vanza, Borkhetaria-Vanza Vaishya and some other castes.
A smaller temple for Bhudarjee Dada, Mataji's brother is erected behind the main temple. This is at a walking distance from the main temple.
Shingavada (શિગૌદા) river flows on one side of the temple.

Sometimes visitors can see lions near the temple or near the river as it's an open habitat for lions, second only to Africa.

Accommodations
Every year thousands of devotes and tourist visit this temple. The temple also provides meals for devotees and tourist. (Please verify this information with the temple trust). Donations to the temple trust are always welcome. Being located in the middle of Gir Sanctuary, as per norms, tourists have to exit the sanctuary before sunset.

Nearby Places
Banej is the nearby religious place one can visit, around 15 km from Shree Kankai Temple. This is a very famous place surrounded by trees, wild animals and nature. 
Tulsishyam is another religious place nearby worth visiting

Transportation

There is a bus from Junagadh every day that leaves at 8am, stays one hour at the temple, and departs on the return journey at 9:45am.

By road: Gir National Park is 60 km from Junagadh, the most common base for making a visit, and 360 km from Ahmedabad.  The main centre is at Sasan Gir that has a forest guest house maintained by the Forest Department, opposite the railway station. There are hotels and guest-houses at Sasan as well as nearby places. One can stay with nature by using these hotels. The temple can be accessed via private vehicles. It is preferred that local taxi should be hired to visit the place.

By rail: One can travel by rail to Junagadh from Ahmedabad or Veraval (Somnath) and then take a 65 km road trip on bus or taxi to Sasan Gir.

By Air: The nearest airport is Rajkot but it is not well connected to major airports of India, hence the suitable Airport is Ahmedabad. One can take train or drive from Ahmedabad.
The climate in Kankai is mild on most days.

There is one Kanaki temple in Kerala. In the Tamil language literature -one epic is there.. the name of the Epic is called Silapathikaram. In this epic, the main woman character is called Kanaki. She suffered in her married life. Her husband-KOVALN left her and lived with his paramour- a dancer for long time. After losing business he returned to his wife Kanaki. The couple left Chola Kingdom and reached Pandian kingdom. When he wanted to start his business again, she gave her ankle ornament (It is called as SILAMPU in Tamil language.) to get money. At the same time King pandian's queen lost her ornament. The guards found the same model of ornament at the hands of Kovalan, the guards produced him in the Court of King  Pandian. The king ordered to hang him.
The order was executed. On hearing the execution Kanaki appeared before the court and asked for justice. She proved that ornament is different from the queen's ornament. Kanaki's ornament contained pearls. The King understood injustice done to a woman. King told that her husband was not a thief, but he king himself was thief. On the shock, he lost his life. She burnt the temple city of Madurai in the anguish..She reached near Kerala (now-Tamil Nadu border)A temple has been erected in memory of her. Her moral character was highly appreciated. The principle was one man one woman. She lived for a man in her life. This temple is Called KANAKI temple. Every year a kind of festival is celebrated at the Kanaki Temple by the people of Southern Tamil Nadu.

References 

https://web.archive.org/web/20100103200554/http://gujarattourism.com/showpage.aspx?contentid=98&webpartid=1279

External links
 Kankai Mata Temple Picture
Gir National Park

Places in Hindu worship